Meganthias carpenteri, the yellowtop jewelfish or Carpenter's yellowtop jewelfish, is a pink and yellow fish found in the eastern Atlantic Ocean named after Old Dominion University marine biologist Kent E. Carpenter.  Meganthias carpenteri is a member of the subfamily Anthiinae which is classified under the family Serranidae which also includes the groupers and the serranine sea basses.

References

Endemic fauna of Nigeria
Anthiinae
Taxa named by William D. Anderson
Fish described in 2006